WHAL-FM is a radio station in Memphis, Tennessee broadcasting an urban gospel format.  The iHeartMedia, Inc. outlet is licensed to nearby Horn Lake, Mississippi.  The station's studios are located in Southeast Memphis, and the transmitter site is in the city's Midtown district.

WHAL-FM broadcasts in HD.

History
Prior to the switch to urban gospel, it has most recently carried an oldies format as "Oldies 95.7", WOTO, until 2003. From December 1993 until April 1, 1999, 95.7 ran an alternative rock format as "96X", WRXQ. The Alternative format was later revived at WMFS in 2000 as "93X", and then again at WIVG in 2012, which also brought back WRXQ's "Never Blend In" chameleon logo.

References

External links
WHAL official website

HAL-FM
Gospel radio stations in the United States
IHeartMedia radio stations